Hatif Janabi (born 1952) is an Iraqi poet, translator and author. Born near Babylon in 1952, he studied Arabic language and literature at Baghdad University. He moved to Warsaw, Poland in 1976 for higher studies, eventually obtaining a master's degree in Polish language and literature and a PhD in drama, both from Warsaw University. He has lived in Poland ever since and now teaches Arabic language and literature at Warsaw University. He has also taught at the University of Tizi Ouzou and Indiana University.

Janabi has published several collections of poetry, and his work has been translated into many languages including Polish, English, French, German, Spanish and Russian. A volume of his poems in English translation was published by the University of Arkansas Press in 1996 under the title Questions and their Retinue. The translator Khaled Mattawa won the Arkansas Arabic Translation Award for this work.

Janabi is also known as one of the principal translators of Polish literature into the Arabic language. He has translated some of the most important Polish writers, among them Adam Mickiewicz, Czeslaw Miłosz, Wislawa Szymborska, Juliusz Słowacki, Zbigniew Herbert, Tadeusz Różewicz, Stanisław Grochowiak, Adam Zagajewski, Edward Stachura, Rafał Wojaczek, Ryszard Kapuściński and Leszek Kołakowski.

References

21st-century Iraqi poets
Iraqi translators
1952 births
Living people
University of Baghdad alumni
University of Warsaw alumni
Academic staff of the University of Warsaw
Indiana University faculty
20th-century Iraqi poets